The Islamic Foundation of Ireland (IFI) was formed in 1959 by Muslim students in Ireland. The society established the first mosque in Ireland in 1976. It also helped to establish mosques in other cities in the country. The headquarters of the foundation is currently at the Dublin Mosque and Islamic Centre, 163 South Circular Road, Dublin 8. The Islamic Foundation of Ireland has been the official representative of Muslims in Ireland since its inception. It describes its role as looking after the religious, educational and social needs of Muslims in Ireland.

See also
 Islam in the Republic of Ireland

External links
Information on Dublin mosque

1959 establishments in Ireland
Islamic organisations based in Ireland
Islamic organizations established in 1959